The 28th Cannes Film Festival was held from 9 to 23 May 1975. The Palme d'Or went to the Chronique des Années de Braise by Mohammed Lakhdar-Hamina. In 1975, a new section, "Les Yeux fertiles", which was non-competitive, was introduced. This section, along with sections "L'Air du temps" and "Le Passé composé" of the next two years, were integrated into Un Certain Regard in 1978.

The festival opened with A Happy Divorce (Un Divorce heureux), directed by Henning Carlsen and closed with Tommy, directed by Ken Russell.

Jury 
The following people were appointed as the Jury of the 1975 feature film competition:

Feature films
Jeanne Moreau (actress) Jury President
André Delvaux (director)
Anthony Burgess (writer)
Fernando Rey (actor)
George Roy Hill (director)
Gérard Ducaux-Rupp (producer)
Léa Massari (actress)
Pierre Mazars (journalist)
Pierre Salinger (writer)
Youlia Solntzeva (actress)

Official selection

In competition - Feature film
The following feature films competed for the Palme d'Or:

Alice Doesn't Live Here Anymore by Martin Scorsese
Aloïse by Liliane de Kermadec
The Amulet of Ogum (O Amuleto de Ogum) by Nelson Pereira dos Santos
Cher Victor (Ce cher Victor) by Robin Davis
Chronicle of the Years of Fire (Chronique des années de Braise) by Mohammed Lakhdar-Hamina
Do You Hear the Dogs Barking? (Ignacio) by François Reichenbach
Electra, My Love (Szerelmem, Elektra) by Miklós Jancsó
The Enigma of Kaspar Hauser (Jeder für sich und Gott gegen alle) by Werner Herzog
A Happy Divorce (Un Divorce heureux) by Henning Carlsen
Lenny by Bob Fosse
Lotte in Weimar by Egon Günther
Man Friday by Jack Gold
Mariken van Nieumeghen by Jos Stelling
Orders (Les Ordres) by Michel Brault
The Passenger (Professione: reporter) by Michelangelo Antonioni
Pastoral: To Die in the Country (Den-en ni shisu) by Shūji Terayama
Scent of a Woman (Profumo di donna) by Dino Risi
Section spéciale by Costa Gavras
The Story of Sin (Dzieje grzechu) by Walerian Borowczyk
They Fought for Their Country (Oni srazhalis za rodinu) by Sergei Bondarchuk
A Touch of Zen (Xia nu) by King Hu
Yuppi du by Adriano Celentano

Films out of competition
The following films were selected to be screened out of competition:

 A Csodalatos Mandarin by Miklós Szinetár
 A faból faragott királyfi by Ádám Horváth
 Anna Karenine by Margarita Pilikhina
 The Day of the Locust by John Schlesinger
 Galileo by Joseph Losey
 Georges Braque ou le temps différent by Frédéric Rossif
 India Song by Marguerite Duras
 Je t'aime, tu danses by François Weyergans
 Trollflojten by Ingmar Bergman
 The Maids by Christopher Miles
 Moses und Aron by Jean-Marie Straub
 The Romantic Englishwoman by Joseph Losey
 Tommy by Ken Russell

Short film competition
The following short films competed for the Short Film Palme d'Or:

 La Corrida by Christian Broutin
 Daryu tebe zvezdu by Fyodor Khitruk
 Don't by Robin Lehman
 L'empreinte by Jacques Cardon
 Kolory życia (Les couleurs de la vie) by Piotr Szpakowicz
 Lautrec by Geoff Dunbar
 Pedestrians by Andrew Ruhl
 Revisited by Joyce Borenstein
 W.O.W. (Women of the World) by Faith Hubley

Parallel sections

International Critics' Week
The following feature films were screened for the 14th International Critics' Week (14e Semaine de la Critique):

 Assassination in Davos (Konfrontation) by Rolf Lyssy (Switzerland)
 Brother Can You Spare a Dime? by Philippe Mora (United Kingdom)
 Vase de noces by Thierry Zeno (Belgium)
 Hester Street by Joan Micklin Silver (United States)
 Knots by David I. Munro (United Kingdom)
 The Musician Killer (L’Assassin musicien) by Benoît Jacquot (France)
 The Peaceful Age (L'età della pace) by Fabio Carpi (Italy)

Directors' Fortnight
The following films were screened for the 1975 Directors' Fortnight (Quinzaine des Réalizateurs):
 Allonsanfan by Paolo and Vittorio Taviani (Italy)
 The Battle of Chile (part 1) (La batalla de Chile: La lucha de un pueblo sin armas - Primera parte: La insurrección de la burguesía) by Patricio Guzman (Chile, Cuba)
 Black Angel (Der schwarze Engel) by Werner Schroeter (West Germany)
 Chac by Rolando Klein (Panama)
 Conjugal Warfare (Guerra conjugal) by Joaquim Pedro de Andrade (Brazil)
 Di Assimanton Aformin by Tassos Psarras (Greece)
 Fox and His Friends (Faustrecht der Freiheit) by Rainer Werner Fassbinder (West Germany)
 French Provincial (Souvenirs d’en France) by André Téchiné (France)
 Jeanne Dielman, 23 Quai du Commerce, 1080 Bruxelles by Chantal Akerman (Belgium, France)
 The Last Day of School Before Christmas (L'ultimo giorno di scuola prima delle vacanze di Natale) by Gian Vittorio Baldi (Italy)
 Milestones by Robert Kramer, John Douglas (United States)
 Njangaan (The Disciple) by Mahama Johnson Traoré (Senegal)
 Les oeillets rouges d'avril by Véra Belmont (France)
 Das Rückendekollete by Jan Nemec (Switzerland)
 Schoolmaster Hofer (Hauptlehrer Hofer) by Peter Lilienthal (West Germany)
 Shazdeh Ehtedjab (Prince Ehtedjab) by Bahman Farmanara (Iran)
 Strah by Matjaz Klopcic (Yugoslavia)
 Strike! (Streik!) by Oddvar Bull Tuhus (Norway)
 Sunday Too Far Away by Ken Hannam (Australia)
 The Texas Chain Saw Massacre by Tobe Hooper (United States)
 The Travelling Players (O Thiassos) by Theo Angelopoulos (Greece)
 The Vultures (Les vautours) by Jean-Claude Labrecque (Canada)
 Zone Interdite by Ahmed Lallem (Algeria)
Short films

 16+- (Chofuku-Ki) by Shuji Terayama (Japan)
 350 by Philippe Pilard (France)
 Echos d'Alger 1955 by Frank Cassenti (France)
 L'Economie des sentiments by Daniel Jouanisson (France)
 Manosolfa by Sandra Coelho de Souza (Brazil)
 Monopolis by Claude Dubrana, J.P. Zirn (France)
 Tadii by Nooradin Zarrin Kelk (Iran)

Awards

Official awards
The following films and people received the 1975 Official selection awards:
Palme d'Or: Chronicle of the Years of Fire (Chronique des Années de Braise) by Mohammed Lakhdar-Hamina, Algeria
Grand Prix: The Enigma of Kaspar Hauser (Jeder für sich und Gott gegen alle) by Werner Herzog
Award for Best Director: Costa Gavras for Section spéciale and Michel Brault for Orders (Les Ordres)
Award for Best Actress: Valerie Perrine for Lenny  
Award for Best Actor: Vittorio Gassman for Scent of a Woman (Profumo di donna)
Short films
Short Film Palme d'Or: Lautrec by Geoff Dunbar 
Special Jury Prize: Daryu tebe zvezdu by Fyodor Khitruk

Independent awards
FIPRESCI
 FIPRESCI Prize:
 The Enigma of Kaspar Hauser (Jeder für sich und Gott gegen alle) by Werner Herzog
 The Travelling Players (O Thiassos) by Theo Angelopoulos
Commission Supérieure Technique
 Technical Grand Prize: A Touch of Zen (Xia nu) by King Hu 
Ecumenical Jury
 Prize of the Ecumenical Jury: The Enigma of Kaspar Hauser (Jeder für sich und Gott gegen alle) by Werner Herzog

References

Media
INA: Jeanne Moreau, president of the 1975 jury (interview in French) Jean Moreau states in the interview that more important than even the Main Selection have become the events of the Parallel Section (Directors' Fortnight, International Critics' Week, and Marché du Film) which make possible the existence of the Festival.

External links
1975 Cannes Film Festival (web.archive)
Official website Retrospective 1975
Cannes Film Festival Awards for 1975 at Internet Movie Database

Cannes Film Festival, 1975
Cannes Film Festival, 1975
Cannes Film Festival